Events in 1942 in animation.

Events

January
 January 11: The Walt Disney Animation Studios releases the wartime propaganda cartoon Donald's Decision starring Donald Duck, directed by Ford Beebe.
 January 11: The Walt Disney Animation Studios releases the wartime propaganda cartoon The New Spirit starring Donald Duck promoting paying income taxes, directed by Wilfred Jackson and Ben Sharpsteen.
 January 26: George Pal's wartime propaganda cartoon Tulips Shall Grow premieres.

February
 February 7: Riley Thomson's Mickey Mouse cartoon Mickey's Birthday Party premieres, produced by Walt Disney Animation Studios.
 February 26: 14th Academy Awards:
 The Pluto cartoon Lend a Paw, produced by Walt Disney Animation Studios, wins the Academy Award for Best Animated Short Film.
 The soundtrack of Dumbo, by Frank Churchill and Oliver Wallace, wins the Academy Award for Best Original Score.
 Walt Disney, William Garity, John N.A. Hawkins, the RCA Manufacturing Company and Leopold Stokowski all win an Academy Honorary Award for Fantasia.
 Walt Disney wins the Irving G. Thalberg Memorial Award.
 February 28: Chuck Jones' short, Conrad the Sailor premieres, produced by Warner Bros. Cartoons. The cartoon is notable for its use of match cuts.

March
 March 20: Riley Thomson's Mickey Mouse cartoon Symphony Hour, produced by Walt Disney Animation Studios, premieres.
 March 28: Friz Freleng's Bugs Bunny cartoon The Wabbit Who Came to Supper, produced by Warner Bros. Cartoons, premieres.
 Walt Disney Animation Studios releases Stop That Tank!, a wartime propaganda short directed by Ub Iwerks.

April
 April 2: Bob Clampett's war time propaganda cartoon Any Bonds Today?, produced by Warner Bros. Cartoons,  starring Bugs Bunny, Porky Pig and Elmer Fudd, is released to promote war bonds.
 April 6: In Nazi Germany Hans Fischerkoesen's Verwitterte Melodie premieres.
 April 10: Jack King's Donald Duck cartoon Donald's Snow Fight, produced by Walt Disney Animation Studios, premieres.
 April 11: Bob Clampett's Horton Hatches the Egg premieres, produced by Warner Bros. Cartoons, based on Dr. Seuss' eponymous short story.
 April 18: In the Tom & Jerry short Dog Trouble, produced by Hanna-Barbera for MGM Animation, Spike the bulldog makes his debut.

May
 May 1: Jack King's Donald Duck cartoon Donald Gets Drafted, produced by Walt Disney Animation Studios, premieres.
 May 2:
 Chuck Jones' Bugs Bunny short The Wacky Wabbit premieres, produced by Warner Bros. Cartoons.
 Norman McCabe's Daffy Duck cartoon Daffy's Southern Exposure, produced by Warner Bros. Cartoons, premiers.
 May 9: Chuck Jones' short, The Draft Horse premieres, produced by Warner Bros. Cartoons.
 May 27: The Fleischer Studios go bankrupt and close down, and their animation department is taken over by Paramount's Famous Studios.

June
 June 6: Chuck Jones' Bugs Bunny short Hold the Lion, Please, produced by Warner Bros. Cartoons, premieres.
 June 22: Walter Lantz' Woody Woodpecker cartoon Ace in the Hole premieres.

July
 July 11: Bob Clampett's Bugs Bunny Gets the Boid premieres, produced by Warner Bros. Cartoons in which Beaky Buzzard makes his debut.
 July 18: The Tom & Jerry short The Bowling Alley-Cat, produced by Hanna-Barbera for MGM Animation, premieres.
 July 21: The Walt Disney Animation Studios releases the war-time propaganda cartoon Food Will Win the War, directed by Hamilton Luske.
 July 30: The Walt Disney Animation Studios releases the wartime propaganda cartoon Out of the Frying Pan and into the Firing Line, directed by Ben Sharpsteen, starring Minnie Mouse and Pluto.

August
 August 1: Norman McCabe's wartime propaganda cartoon The Ducktators premieres, produced by Warner Bros. Cartoons. The cartoon satirizes Adolf Hitler, Benito Mussolini and Hideki Tojo.
 August 9: The Walt Disney Animation Studios releases Bambi.
 August 22:
 Friz Freleng's Bugs Bunny cartoon Fresh Hare, produced by Warner Bros. Cartoons, premieres.
 Tex Avery's first cartoon for MGM Animation premieres: Blitz Wolf. It's a war time propaganda short in which the Three Little Pigs story is retold with Adolf Hitler as the Big Bad Wolf.
 August 24: Walt Disney's Saludos Amigos premieres, an animated feature starring Donald Duck, aimed at the Latin American market, which will receive its U.S. premier half a year later. It marks the debut of José Carioca who will become a popular comics character in Brazil.
 August 29: Tex Avery's The Early Bird Dood It!, produced by MGM Animation, premieres.

September
 September 4: Jack Kinney's Goofy cartoon How to Play Baseball, produced by Walt Disney Animation Studios, premieres.
 September 6: The wartime propaganda cartoon You're a Sap, Mr. Jap starring Popeye, directed by Dan Gordon, produced by Famous Studios, premieres.
 September 18: The wartime propaganda cartoon Japoteurs starring Superman, directed by Seymour Kneitel, produced by Famous Studios, premieres.
 September 19: Chuck Jones'  short, The Dover Boys premieres, produced by Warner Bros. Cartoons. The short is notable for the use of limited animation and drybrush smear techniques.
 September 25: Jack King's Donald Duck cartoon The Vanishing Private, produced by Walt Disney Animation Studios, premieres.

October
 October 3: Bob Clampett's The Hep Cat, produced by Warner Bros. Cartoons, premieres.
 October 8: Chuck Jones' The Squawkin' Hawk premieres, produced by Warner Bros. Cartoons which marks the debut of Henery Hawk.
 October 9: Jack Kinney's Goofy cartoon The Olympic Champ, produced by Walt Disney Animation Studios, premieres.
 October 10: The Tom & Jerry short Fine Feathered Friend, produced by Hanna-Barbera for MGM Animation, marks the debut of the iconic Tom & Jerry theme song.
 October 23: Jack Kinney's Goofy cartoon How to Swim, produced by Walt Disney Animation Studios, premieres.
 October 24: Norman McCabe's Daffy Duck cartoon The Daffy Duckaroo, produced by Warner Bros. Cartoons, premieres.

November
 November 6: The wartime propaganda cartoon Sky Trooper starring Donald Duck, directed by Jack King and produced by the Walt Disney Company, is first released.
 November 20:
 The wartime propaganda cartoon Eleventh Hour starring Superman, directed by Dan Gordon, produced by Famous Studios, premieres.
 The wartime propaganda cartoon Scrap the Japs starring Popeye, directed by Seymour Kneitel, produced by Famous Studios, premieres.
 Dante Quinterno's Upa en apuros premieres which is the first Argentine/ South American animated feature in colour.
 November 21: Bob Clampett's A Tale of Two Kitties premieres, produced by Warner Bros. Cartoons which marks the debut of Tweety Bird.

December
 December 5: Chuck Jones's Daffy Duck and Porky Pig cartoon My Favorite Duck, produced by  Warner Bros. Cartoons, premieres.
 December 9: Jack Kinney's Goofy cartoon How to Fish, produced by Walt Disney Animation Studios, premieres.
 December 12: Chuck Jones' Bugs Bunny short Case of the Missing Hare premieres, produced by Warner Bros. Cartoons.
 December 25: The Popeye cartoon Me Musical Nephews starring Popeye premieres, directed by Seymour Kneitel and produced by Famous Studios.

Specific date unknown
 Roberto Sgrilli creates the animated short Anacleto e la Faina.
 Norman McLaren's Hen Hop is released.

Films released

 August 9 - Bambi (United States)
 August 24 - Saludos Amigos (United States)
 December 24 - 15.000 Dibujos (Chile)

Births

January
 January 8: Stephen Hawking, English theoretical physicist, cosmologist and author (voiced himself in The Simpsons episodes "They Saved Lisa's Brain", "Don't Fear the Roofer", "Stop, Or My Dog Will Shoot!" and "Elementary School Musical", and the Futurama episodes "Anthology of Interest I", "The Beast with a Billion Backs" and "Reincarnation"), (d. 2018).
 January 11: Clarence Clemons, American musician and actor (voice of the Narrator in The Simpsons episode "Grift of the Magi"), (d. 2011).
 January 14: Michael Mills, British-born Canadian producer and director (Evolution, The Happy Prince, History of the World in Three Minutes Flat).
 January 17: Muhammad Ali, American boxer (voiced himself in I Am the Greatest: The Adventures of Muhammad Ali), (d. 2016).
 January 27: John Witherspoon, American actor and comedian (voice of Dad in Waynehead, Oran Jones in The Proud Family, Robert Freeman in The Boondocks, S. Ward Smith in Randy Cunningham: 9th Grade Ninja, Scofflaw in the Happily Ever After: Fairy Tales for Every Child episode "The Prince and the Pauper", Wayne in the Kim Possible episode "Rewriting History", Jimmy in the Animals episode "Squirrels", Franco Aplenty in the BoJack Horseman episode "Surprise"), (d. 2019).

February
 February 1: Terry Jones, Welsh-British actor, comedian, writer and film director (occasional voices in Terry Gilliam's animated shorts in Monty Python's Flying Circus and its film spin-offs, co-creator of Blazing Dragons), (d. 2020).
 February 2: Ed Bogas, American musician and composer (Fritz the Cat, Heavy Traffic, Peanuts, Garfield and Friends).
 February 13: Simon Prebble, English-American actor (voice of the Computer, Professor Frith and Jennings in Courage the Cowardly Dog, additional voices in Kenny the Shark).

March
 March 7: Michael Eisner, American businessman (The Walt Disney Company, founder of The Tornante Company, co-creator of Glenn Martin, DDS).
 March 27: Michael York, English actor (voice of Nuvo Vindi in Star Wars: The Clone Wars, Patrick in Ben 10: Alien Force and Ben 10: Ultimate Alien, Xan in Super Robot Monkey Team Hyperforce Go!, Pterano in The Land Before Time VII: The Stone of Cold Fire, Ares in the Justice League Unlimited episode "Hawk and Dove", Count Vertigo in the Batman: The Animated Series episode "Off Balance").

April
 April 20: Ishu Patel, Indian animation film director, producer, and educator.
 April 30: Bill Dennis, American animation executive (founder of Toonz Media Group), (d. 2023).

May
 May 2: Enrico Bertorelli, Italian actor (dub voice of Cell and Commander Red in Dragon Ball Z, James Gordon in Batman: The Animated Series), (d. 2020).
 May 11: Terry McGovern, American actor and radio personality (voice of Launchpad McQuack in DuckTales and Darkwing Duck).
 May 19: Flemming Quist Møller, Danish director (Benny's Bathtub, Jungledyret Hugo), animator, author, drummer, screenwriter and actor (voice of the Feather King in Beyond Beyond), (d. 2022).

June
 June 15: Ian Greenberg, Canadian businessman and media pioneer (co-founder of Astral Media, former owner of Family Channel), (d. 2022).
 June 18: Paul McCartney, English singer (voice of Rupert Bear in Rupert and the Frog Song, himself in The Simpsons episode "Lisa the Vegetarian").

July
 July 2: Picha, Belgian cartoonist, comics artist, animator and film director (Tarzoon: Shame of the Jungle, The Missing Link, The Big Bang, Snow White: The Sequel).
 July 13: Harrison Ford, American actor (voice of Han Solo in The Star Wars Holiday Special, Rooster in The Secret Life of Pets 2).
 July 24: Chris Sarandon, American actor (voice of Jack Skellington in The Nightmare Before Christmas, Kurotowa in Nausicaa of the Valley of the Wind, Count Dracula in Teenage Mutant Ninja Turtles, Zebulon Kirk in The Chosen One, Myka in The Wild Thornberrys episode "Look Who's Squawking", Matt in the Danny Phantom episode "Pirate Radio").
 July 29: Tony Sirico, American actor (portrayed himself in the Family Guy episode "Stewie, Chris, & Brian's Excellent Adventure", voice of Vinny in Family Guy, Enzo Perotti in American Dad!, Big Daddy in The Fairly OddParents episodes "Talkin' Trash" and "Big Wanda"), (d. 2022).

August
 August 20: Isaac Hayes, American singer and actor (voice of Chef in South Park), (d. 2008).

September
 September 19: Victor Brandt, American actor (voice of Emil Hamilton in Superman: The Animated Series, General Crozier in Metalocalypse, Master Pakku in Avatar: The Last Airbender, Vladimir Kozyrev in the Totally Spies! episode "Child's Play", Rupert Thorne in The Batman episode "The Bat in the Belfry").
 September 29:
 Madeleine Kahn, American actress, comedian, and singer (voice of Draggle in My Little Pony: The Movie, Gussie Mausheimer in An American Tail, Gypsy in A Bug's Life, Mrs. Shapiro in the Little Bill episode "The Campout"), (d. 1999).
 Ian McShane, English actor (voice of Captain Hook in Shrek the Third, Tai Lung in Kung Fu Panda, Saiwa in My Father's Dragon, Artemis in The Simpsons episode "The Last Barfighter").

October
 October 2: Peter Newman, American voice actor (voice of Tygra and Wilykit in ThunderCats, Peter Knook, Awgwas, and the Gnome King in The Life and Adventures of Santa Claus, Mumbo Jumbo and Quicksilver in Silverhawks, Nikolai Jakov in Archer).
October 3:
 Steve Susskind, American actor (voice of J.J. Eureka Vatos in The Tick, Irate Chef in The Emperor's New Groove, Jerry Slugworth in Monsters, Inc., Sergeant Squash in the DuckTales episode "Duckworth's Revolt", Maxie Zeus in the Batman: The Animated Series episode "Fire from Olympus"), (d. 2005).
 Alan Rachins, American actor (voice of Norman Osborn in The Spectacular Spider-Man, Clock King in the DC Animated Universe, Ned Staples in Scooby-Doo! Mecha Mutt Menace).
 October 20: Robert Costanzo, American actor (voice of Harvey Bullock in the DC Animated Universe, Philoctetes in Hercules and House of Mouse, Maximillius Moose in Foodfight!).
 October 26: Bob Hoskins, English actor (portrayed Eddie Valiant in Who Framed Roger Rabbit, voice of Boris in Balto), (d. 2014).
 October 31: David Ogden Stiers, American actor (voice of Cogsworth in Beauty and the Beast, Ratcliffe and Wiggins in Pocahontas, the Archdeacon in The Hunchback of Notre Dame, Jumba in the Lilo & Stitch franchise), (d. 2018).

November
 November 1: Marcia Wallace, American actress and comedian (voice of Edna Krabappel and Ms. Melon in The Simpsons, Clovis, Mrs. Cavanaugh and Didi Lovelost in Darkwing Duck, 'Dark Interlude' Actress in the Batman: The Animated Series episode "Mudslide", Mrs. Blossom in The Addams Family episode "Sweetheart of a Brother", Mrs. Wheeler in the Captain Planet and the Planeteers episode "Talkin' Trash", Oopa in the Aladdin episode "The Game", Old Woman in the I Am Weasel episode "Driver's Sped", Mrs. Beaver in The Angry Beavers episode "If You In-Sisters", Mrs. Rapple in the Rugrats episode "Lil's Phil of Trash", additional voices in Camp Candy and Monsters University), (d. 2013).
 November 8: Tony Eastman, American animator (Sniz & Fondue, Saturday TV Funhouse, Between the Lions, Courage the Cowardly Dog, Harvey Birdman, Attorney at Law), storyboard artist (MTV Animation, Sheep in the Big City, I Spy, Codename: Kids Next Door) and director (Doug), (d. 2020).
 November 20: Bob Einstein, American actor, comedy writer and producer (voice of Super Dave Osborne in Super Dave: Daredevil for Hire, Elephant Trainer and The Bookie in The Life & Times of Tim, Stuff in Strange Magic), (d. 2019).
 November 24: Billy Connolly, Scottish actor and comedian (voice of Ben in Pocahontas, King Fergus in Brave, McSquizzy in Open Season and Open Season 2).

December
 December 16: Susan Shadburne, American screenwriter, director, producer, and filmmaker (Will Vinton Productions), (d. 2018).
 December 18: Harvey Atkin, Canadian actor (voice of Alien/Henchman in Heavy Metal, King Koopa in The Super Mario Bros. Super Show!), (d. 2017).

Specific date unknown
 Richard Condie, Canadian animator, filmmaker and musician (The Big Snit).
 Aylin Özmenek, Turkish animator, (d. 2021).
 Fernando Ruiz Álvarez, Mexican animator (The Sword in the Stone) and director (Los Tres Reyes Magos, La Bruja Chiriloca, Los Telerines, The Adventures of Oliver Twist), (d. 2021).

Deaths

May
May 14: Frank Churchill, American composer and songwriter (Walt Disney Animation Studios), dies at age 40.

See also
List of anime by release date (1939–1945)

References

External links 
Animated works of the year, listed in the IMDb